Tanichthys is a genus of freshwater fish in the carp family (Cyprinidae) of order Cypriniformes. They are native to rivers and streams in China and Vietnam. Until recently, the type species, T. albonubes, was the only one known.  In 2001, however, Freyhof and Herder described a new and very similar species, T. micagemmae,  from the Ben Hai River in Vietnam and V. H. Nguyen & S. V. Ngô described a third species from Vietnam.

The name Tanichthys comes from the name of the Chinese Boy Scout leader, Tan, who discovered the first specimen.

Species 
 Tanichthys albiventris F. Li, T. Y. Liao, J. Bohlen, Z. X. Shen, L. J. Zhao & S. Li, 2022
 Tanichthys albonubes S. Y. Lin, 1932 (White cloud mountain minnow)
 Tanichthys flavianalis F. Li, T. Y. Liao, J. Bohlen, Z. X. Shen, L. J. Zhao & S. Li, 2022
 Tanichthys kuehnei Bohlen, Dvorák, Ha & Šlechtová, 2019 (Lemon white cloud)
 Tanichthys micagemmae Freyhof & Herder, 2001 (Vietnamese cardinal minnow)
 Tanichthys thacbaensis V. H. Nguyễn & S. V. Ngô, 2001

References

External links 
 
 

Tincinae
Cyprinidae genera
Cyprinid fish of Asia
Paleontology in Shandong